Rukavac is a village in western Croatia. It is located in the Primorje-Gorski Kotar County near the towns of Matulji and Opatija.

Populated places in Primorje-Gorski Kotar County